William Frederick Logan (March 15, 1907 – November 6, 1955) was a Canadian speed skater who competed in the 1928 Winter Olympics and in the 1932 Winter Olympics.

He was born in Saint John, New Brunswick.

In 1928 he finished eleventh in the 500 metres event, 21st in the 1500 metres competition and 29th in the 5000 metres event.

Four years later he won the bronze medal in the 1500 metres event as well as in the 5000 metres competition. In the 500 metres event he finished fifth. He also participated in the 10000 metres competition but was eliminated in the heats.

Personal Bests: 500 - 45.2 (1928); 1500 - 2.35.6 (1928); 5000 - 9.58.3 (1928).

External links
 Profile

1907 births
1955 deaths
Canadian male speed skaters
Olympic speed skaters of Canada
Speed skaters at the 1928 Winter Olympics
Speed skaters at the 1932 Winter Olympics
Sportspeople from Saint John, New Brunswick
New Brunswick Sports Hall of Fame inductees
Olympic bronze medalists for Canada
Olympic medalists in speed skating
Medalists at the 1932 Winter Olympics
20th-century Canadian people